Johannes Hellner (22 April 1866 in Svedala – 19 February 1947 in Stockholm) was a Swedish jurist, civil servant and Liberal Coalition Party politician. He served as Minister for Foreign Affairs from 1917 to 1920.

References 

1866 births
1947 deaths
People from Svedala Municipality
Liberal Party of Sweden politicians
Swedish Ministers for Foreign Affairs
Swedish jurists